SMS Stettin ("His Majesty's Ship Stettin") was a   light cruiser of the Kaiserliche Marine. Laid down at AG Vulcan Stettin shipyard in 1906, Stettin was launched in March 1907 and commissioned into the High Seas Fleet seven months later in October.

In 1912, Stettin joined the battlecruiser  and cruiser  for a goodwill visit to the United States. After the outbreak of World War I, Stettin served in the reconnaissance forces of the German fleet. She saw heavy service for the first three years of the war, including at the Battle of Heligoland Bight in August 1914 and the Battle of Jutland in May – June 1916, along with other smaller operations in the North and Baltic Seas. In 1917, she was withdrawn from frontline service and used as a training ship until the end of the war. In the aftermath of Germany's defeat, Stettin was surrendered to the Allies and broke up for scrap in 1921–1923.

Design

The Königsberg -class ships were designed to serve both as fleet scouts in home waters and in Germany's colonial empire. The Königsberg class was an iterative development of the preceding . All four members of the class were intended to be identical, but after the initial vessel was begun, the design staff incorporated lessons from the Russo-Japanese War. These included internal rearrangements and a lengthening of the hull.

She displaced  at full load. Her propulsion system consisted of a pair of Parsons steam turbines with steam provided by eleven coal-fired Marine-type water-tube boilers. Stettin had a crew of 14 officers and 308 enlisted men.

The ship was armed with a main battery of ten  SK L/40 guns in single pedestal mounts. Two were placed side-by-side forward on the forecastle, six were located amidships, three on either side, and two were side by side aft. They were supplied with 1,500 rounds of ammunition, amounting to 150 shells per gun. The ship was also equipped with eight  SK guns with 4,000 rounds of ammunition. She was also equipped with a pair of  torpedo tubes with five torpedoes submerged in the hull on the broadside.

Service history

Stettin was ordered under the contract name "Ersatz " and was laid down at the AG Vulcan shipyard in her namesake city in 1906. She was launched on 7 March 1907, after which fitting-out work commenced. She was commissioned into the High Seas Fleet on 29 October 1907.

After her commissioning, Stettin served with the High Seas Fleet in German waters. In early 1912, Stettin was assigned to a goodwill cruise to the United States, along with the battlecruiser , the only German capital ship to ever visit the US, and the light cruiser . On 11 May 1912 the ships left Kiel and arrived off Hampton Roads, Virginia, on 30 May. There, they met the US Atlantic Fleet and were greeted by then-President William Howard Taft aboard the presidential yacht . After touring the East Coast for two weeks, they returned to Kiel on 24 June.

Actions in the North Sea
At the outbreak of World War I in August 1914, Stettin was serving in the North Sea with the High Seas Fleet. On 6 August, she and the cruiser  escorted a flotilla of U-boats into the North Sea in an attempt to draw out the British fleet, which could then be attacked by the U-boats. The force returned to port on 11 August, without having encountered any British warships. Some two weeks later, on 28 August, Stettin was involved in the Battle of Heligoland Bight. At the start of the engagement, Stettin, and  stood in support of the line of torpedo boats patrolling the Heligoland Bight; Stettin was at anchor to the northeast of Heligoland island, and the other two ships were on either side. The German screen was under the command of Rear Admiral Franz von Hipper, the commander of reconnaissance forces for the High Seas Fleet.

When the British first attacked the German torpedo boats, Hipper immediately dispatched Stettin and Frauenlob, and several other cruisers that were in distant support, to come to their aid. At 08:32, Stettin received the report of German torpedo boats in contact with the British, and immediately weighed anchor and steamed off to support them. The attack forced the British ships to break off and turn back west. During the engagement, lookouts aboard Stettin spotted a British cruiser in the distance, but it did not join the battle. By 9:10, the British had withdrawn out of range, and Stettin fell back to get steam in all of her boilers. During this portion of the battle, the ship was hit once, on the starboard No. 4 gun, which killed two men and badly injured another.

By 10:00, Stettin had steam in all of her boilers, and was capable of her top speed. She therefore returned to the battle, and at 10:06, she encountered eight British destroyers and immediately attacked them, opening fire at 10:08. Several hits were observed in the British formation, which dispersed and fled. By 10:13, the visibility had decreased, and Stettin could no longer see the fleeing destroyers, and so broke off the chase. The ship had been hit several times in return, without causing significant damage, but killing another two and wounding another four men. At around 13:40, Stettin reached with the cruiser , which was just coming under attack from several British battlecruisers. Stettins crew could see the large muzzle flashes in the haze, which after having disabled Ariadne, turned on Stettin at 14:05. The haze saved the ship, which was able to escape after ten salvos missed her. At 14:20, she encountered . The German battlecruisers  and Moltke reached the scene by 15:25, by which time the British had already disengaged and withdrawn. After conducting a short reconnaissance further west, the Germans returned to port, arriving in Wilhelmshaven by 21:30.

On 15 December, the battlecruisers of I Scouting Group, led by Hipper, conducted a bombardment of Scarborough, Hartlepool, and Whitby on the English coast. The main body of the High Seas Fleet, commanded by Admiral Friedrich von Ingenohl, stood by in distant support; Stettin and two flotillas of torpedo boats screened the rear of the formation. That evening, the German battle fleet of some twelve dreadnoughts and eight pre-dreadnoughts came to within  of an isolated squadron of six British battleships. However, skirmishes between the rival screens in the darkness convinced Ingenohl that he was faced with the entire Grand Fleet. Under orders from Kaiser Wilhelm II to avoid risking the fleet unnecessarily, Ingenohl broke off the engagement and turned the battle fleet back toward Germany.

Operations in the Baltic
On 7 May 1915, IV Scouting Group, which by then consisted of Stettin, Stuttgart, and Danzig, and twenty-one torpedo boats was sent into the Baltic Sea to support a major operation against Russian positions at Libau. The operation was commanded by Rear Admiral Hopman, the commander of the reconnaissance forces in the Baltic. IV Scouting Group was tasked with screening to the north to prevent any Russian naval forces from moving out of the Gulf of Finland undetected, while several armored cruisers and other warships bombarded the port. The Russians did attempt to intervene with a force of four cruisers: Admiral Makarov, Bayan, Oleg, and Bogatyr. The Russian ships briefly engaged München, but both sides were unsure of the others' strength, and so both disengaged. Shortly after the bombardment, Libau was captured by the advancing German army, and Stettin and the rest of IV Scouting Group were recalled to the High Seas Fleet.

Battle of Jutland

In May 1916, the German fleet commander, Admiral Reinhard Scheer, planned a major operation to cut off and destroy an isolated squadron of the British fleet. The operation resulted in the battle of Jutland on 31 May – 1 June 1916. During the battle, Stettin served as the flagship of Commodore Ludwig von Reuter, the commander of IV Scouting Group. IV Scouting Group was tasked with screening for the main German battlefleet. As the German fleet approached the scene of the unfolding engagement between the British and German battlecruiser squadrons, Stettin steamed ahead of the leading German battleship, with the rest of the Group dispersed to screen for submarines. Stettin and IV Scouting Group were not heavily engaged during the early phases of the battle, but around 21:30, they encountered the British cruiser . Stettin and München briefly fired on the British ship, but poor visibility forced the ships to cease fire. Reuter turned his ships 90 degrees away and disappeared in the haze.

During the withdrawal from the battle on the night of 31 May at around 23:30, the battlecruisers Moltke and Seydlitz passed ahead of Stettin too closely, forcing her to slow down. The rest of IV Scouting Group did not notice the reduction in speed, and so the ships became disorganized. A ferocious firefight at very close range ensued; Stettin was hit twice early in the engagement and was set on fire. A shell fragment punctured the steam pipe for the ship's siren, and the escaping steam impaired visibility and forced the ship to abandon an attempt to launch torpedoes. In the melee,  was hit by approximately eighteen 10.5 cm shells, including some from Stettin. In the meantime, the German cruiser Frauenlob was set on fire and sunk; as the German cruisers turned to avoid colliding with the sinking wreck, IV Scouting Group became dispersed. Only München remained with Stettin.

By 04:00 on 1 June, the German fleet had evaded the British fleet and reached Horns Reef; the Germans then returned to port. In the course of the battle, Stettin had suffered eight men killed and another 28 wounded. She had fired a total of 81 rounds of ammunition from her 10.5 cm guns.

Fate
In 1917, Stettin was withdrawn from front line service and used as a training ship with the U-boat school. She served in this capacity until the end of the war. Under Article 185 of the Treaty of Versailles, which ended the war after the Armistice that ceased fighting on 11 November 1918, Stettin was listed among the warships still in German service that were to be surrendered to the Allied powers, and accordingly she was stricken on 5 November 1919. She was surrendered to Great Britain as a war prize on 15 September 1920, under the transfer name "T". She was then sold to shipbreakers in Copenhagen and dismantled for scrap in 1921–1923.

Notes

Footnotes

Citations

References

Further reading
 
 

Königsberg-class cruisers (1905)
Ships built in Stettin
1907 ships
World War I cruisers of Germany